The Holley Medal is an award of ASME (the American Society of Mechanical Engineers) for "outstanding and unique act(s) of an engineering nature, accomplishing a noteworthy and timely public benefit by one or more individuals for a single achievement, provided the contributions are equal or comparable." 

The award was established in 1924 in honor of the American mechanical engineer, inventor and charter member of ASME Alexander Lyman Holley (1832-1888).

List of recipients 

 1924, Hjalmar G. Carlson	
 1928, Elmer Ambrose Sperry
 1930,	Baron Chuza-buro Shiba 	
 1934,	Irving Langmuir	
 1936,	Henry Ford 
 1937,	Frederick Gardner Cottrell	
 1938,	Francis Hodgkinson			
 1939,	Carl Edvard Johansson 		
 1940,	Edwin Howard Armstrong	
 1941,	John Garand
 1942,	Ernest Lawrence		
 1943, Vannevar Bush
 1944, Carl Norden
 1945,	Sanford Alexander Moss
 1946,	Norman Gibson			
 1947,	Raymond D. Johnson			
 1948,	Edwin H. Land	
 1950,	Charles Gordon Curtis			
 1951,	George R. Fink		
 1952,	Sanford Lockwood Cluett		
 1953,	Philip M. McKenna		
 1954,	Walter A. Shewhart		
 1955,	George J. Hood			
 1957,	Charles Stark Draper		
 1959,	Col. Maurice J. Fletcher		
 1961,	Thomas Elmer Moon
 1963,	William Shockley
 1968,	Chester Carlson
 1973,	Harold Eugene Edgerton, Kenneth J. Germeshausen 
 1975,	George M. Grover	
 1976,	Emmett Leith, Juris Upatnieks
 1977,	J. David Margerum	
 1979,	Bruce G. Collipp, Douwe de Vries
 1980, Soichiro Honda
 1982,	Jack Kilby
 1985,	John Vincent Atanasoff
 1986,	Wilson Greatbatch
 1987,	Robert J. Moffat
 1988,	Vernon D. Roosa
 1989,	Jack S. Kilby, Jerry D. Merryman, James H. Van Tassel
 1990,	Roy J. Plunkett		
 1991,	James R. Thompson
 1994,	Dominick Danna, Richard W. Newman, William C. Moore
 1996,	Bernard J. Miller	
 1998,	Donna Shirley
 2001,	Heinz Erzberger
 2005,	James D. Walker
 2008,	David G. Lilley 
 2010, Ashwani K. Gupta
 2020,	Yogesh Jaluria

See also

 List of mechanical engineering awards

References 

Awards established in 1924
Awards of the American Society of Mechanical Engineers